Stella Mozgawa is an Australian drummer, best known as a member of the indie rock band Warpaint, with whom she has recorded four studio albums. Alongside her work with Warpaint, Mozgawa has contributed to recordings by musicians Kurt Vile, Adam Green, Cate Le Bon, the xx, Tim Presley, Tom Jones, Kim Gordon and Regina Spektor.

During the COVID-19 pandemic, Mozgawa co-produced Courtney Barnett's third studio album, Things Take Time, Take Time, released in November 2021.

Biography

Childhood and early life
Growing up in Sydney, Mozgawa was raised by her Polish parents, who had moved from Poland to Australia to perform music together as a musical duo.

At age 13, Mozgawa began playing the drums, and was initially influenced by the drummer Zac Hanson from the pop band Hanson. She explained: "For a lot of people who are a half-generation older than me it was Tommy Lee, but for me it was Zac Hanson from Hanson. I'm probably in a smaller group of people who were really turned on to the profession by that particular man". At age 14, Mozgawa pretended to be a "20-year-old Polish immigrant with no ID" to perform at Sydney music venues.

Early career
From 2000 Mozgawa's early Sydney bands included Nick Maybury on lead guitar. Early in 2006 Mozgawa and Maybury formed Mink in New York City alongside Neal Carlson on lead vocals, Grant Fitzpatrick on bass guitar and David Lowy on rhythm guitar. The pop rock group issued a self-titled debut album in August 2007 but had disbanded  by 2009.

Mozgawa befriended Red Hot Chili Peppers bass guitarist Flea, who suggested she move to Los Angeles, eventually meeting the members of Warpaint. During this time she lived at Flea's house: "He was so instrumental in me meeting the Warpaint girls. He was the first person to even say their name to me and the first time I hung out with them was around him and around his friends, so he had a huge part to do with that. There’s a lot of people from that era that were raised on certain music that have so much integrity. Whether you’re a Red Hot Chilli Peppers fan or not, he really means what he does and he’s a punk at heart. He doesn’t give a shit about metrics or who’s popular, he’s just about the soul of music."

With Warpaint

In Los Angeles, Mozgawa befriended Warpaint vocalist and guitarist Theresa Wayman in late 2009. She was subsequently invited to join the band and replaced Shannyn Sossamon. Mozgawa featured in the recording of the band's first album, The Fool (2010). In 2014, the band released its second studio album, Warpaint, with Mozgawa contributing fully to the songwriting process, followed by Heads Up in 2016.

Remixes
Mozgawa has remixed several artists, including Daughter, Shura, Sarah Blasko, Eves the Behavior and Depeche Mode.

Discography
with Warpaint

The Fool (2010)
Warpaint (2014)
Heads Up (2016)
Radiate Like This (2022)

with Belief
Belief (2022)

with Kurt Vile
Wakin on a Pretty Daze (2013)
It's a Big World Out There (And I Am Scared) (2013)
B'lieve I'm Goin Down... (2015)
Spotify Sessions (2015)
Lotta Sea Lice (2017) (with Courtney Barnett)
Bottle It In (2018)
Watch My Moves (2022)

Session appearances
Helen Burns (2012) – Flea
Spirit in the Room (2012) – Tom Jones
Howlin' (2013) – Jagwar Ma
There There (2014) – Megan Washington
Wonder Where We Land (2014) – SBTRKT
My Dreams Dictate My Reality (2015) – Soko
Right On! (2015) – Jenny Lee Lindberg
Crab Day (2016) – Cate Le Bon
Furnaces (2016) – Ed Harcourt
Aladdin (2016) – Adam Green
Murdered Out (2016) – Kim Gordon
The WiNK (2016) – Tim Presley
Every Now and Then (2016) – Jagwar Ma
Remember Us to Life (2016) – Regina Spektor
The Good Book (2016) – Andy Clockwise
Clashes (2016) – Monika Brodka
I See You (2017) – The xx
Young Adult (2017) – Rodes Rollins
I Romanticize (2017) – H Hawkline
LoveLaws (2018) – TT
Record (2018) – Tracey Thorn
Remind Me Tomorrow (2019) – Sharon Van Etten
Diviner (2019) - Hayden Thorpe
Reward (2019) – Cate Le Bon
Return to Center (2019) – Kirin J Callinan
Ceremony (2020) – Phantogram
Boy from Michigan (2021) - John Grant
Things Take Time, Take Time (2021) – Courtney Barnett
Pompeii (2022) - Cate Le Bon

With Desert Sessions
Volume 11: Arrivederci Despair (2019) - Desert Sessions
Volume 12: Tightwads & Nitwits & Critics & Heels (2019) - Desert Sessions

Awards and nominations

ARIA Music Awards
The ARIA Music Awards is an annual awards ceremony that recognises excellence, innovation, and achievement across all genres of Australian music. They commenced in 1987. 

! 
|-
| 2022
| Courtney Barnett & Stella Mozgawa for Courtney Barnett – Things Take Time, Take Time
| Producer – Best Produced Album
| 
| 
|-
|}

References

Living people
Australian rock drummers
Australian people of Polish descent
Women drummers
Musicians from Sydney
1986 births
21st-century women musicians
21st-century drummers
Warpaint (band) members